The fifth edition of the Hip Hop World Awards took place on May 16, 2009, at the Eko Hotel and Suites in Victoria Island, Lagos. The ceremony was conducted without a host. Wande Coal was the biggest winner of the night with five plaques, including Artiste of the Year. Don Jazzy won the Producer of the Year award. Hip hop duo Skuki won the Next Rated category. Da Grin's C.E.O won for Best Rap Album in a posthumous fashion. He was also honored by General Pype during the singer's performance.

Performers
Goldie Harvey 
Obiwon
Ark Quake – "Alanta"
D'Prince
Wande Coal
General Pype

Winners and nominees

Album of the Year 
C.E.O – Da Grin
Mushin 2 Mo'Hits – Wande Coal (Winner)
Un-darey-ted – Darey
Danger – P-Square
Least Expected – Bracket

Artiste of the Year  
Wande Coal (Winner)
Terry G
Darey
Bracket
Da Grin

Song of the Year 
"Yori Yori" – Bracket (Winner)
"Kokoroko" – Kefee (featuring Timaya)
"You Bad" – Wande Coal (featuring D'banj) 
"Free Madness Pt.2" – Terry G
"Alanta" – Art Quake

Recording of the Year 
"Strong Ting" – Banky W.
"I Love You" – P-Square
"Heaven Please" – Timi Dakolo (Winner)
"Keeper of My Dreams" – Lara George

Producer of the Year 
Tee-Y Mix
Cobhams Asuquo
Don Jazzy (Winner)
Sossick
Dokta Frabz

Best Music Video Director 
Jude Okoye – "Danger"
Wudi Awa – "Kokoroko"
Clarence Peters – "Finest" (Winner)
Bobby Boulders – "Ako Mi Ti Poju"
MEX – "Safe"

Best R&B Single 
"Strong Ting" – Banky W. (Winner)
"Never Felt A Love" – Capital Femi
"I Love You" – P-Square
"No Stars" – Darey
"Overkillin" – Djinee

Best Pop Single 
"Yori Yori" – Bracket
"You Bad" – Wande Coal (featuring D'banj) (Winner) 
"Kokoroko" – Kefee (featuring Timaya)
"Danger" – P-Square
"Hotter than Fire" – Dr. Pat and Sheyman

Best R&B/Pop Album 
Mushin 2 Mo'Hits – Wande Coal (Winner)Danger – P-Square
Least Expected – Bracket 
Un-darey-ted – Darey

Best Rap Single 
"Ako Mi Ti Poju" – Naeto C
"Owo Ati Swagger" – Cartiair
"Finest" – Knight House (featuring Sauce Kid and Teeto)"Sample" (Remix) – Terry Tha Rapman (featuring Stereo Man and Pherowshuz) (Winner)"Somebody Wants to Die" – M.I

Best Rap Album C.E.O'' – Da Grin (Winner)Dat Ibo Boy – IllblissMore Than Rap Music – CartiairThe Investment'' – Kel

Lyricist on the Roll  
M.I – "Somebody Wants to Die"
Mode 9 – "Bad Man" (Winner)
OD – "Got to Love Me"
Pherowshuz – "Sample" (Remix) – Terry Tha Rapman (featuring Stereo Man and Pherowshuz)

Best Collaboration 
"Kokoroko" – Kefee (featuring Timaya) (Winner) 
"Finest" – Knight House (featuring Sauce Kid and Teeto)
"Aye Po Gan" – Illbliss (featuring Terry G)
"Sample Remix" – Terry Tha Rapman (featuring Stereo Man and Pherowshuz)

Best Male Vocal Performance 
Darey – "No Stars" (Winner)
Banky W. – "Strong Ting"
Wande Coal – "Banana"
GT the Guitarman – "Kinimatise"
Timi Dakolo – "Heaven Please"

Best Female Vocal Performance 
Ibiyemi – "Don't Leave Me"
Kefee – "Kokoroko"
Lara George – "Keeper of my Dreams" (Winner)
Waje – "Kolo"
Eva Alordiah – "No Cry"

Best Street Hop Artiste 
Terry G – "Free Madness Pt.2" (Winner)
Klever J (featuring Eedris Abdulkareem) – "Igboro Ti Daru" 
Jaywon – "File Be"
Art Quake – "Alanta"
Side One – "One by One"

Next Rated
General Pype – "Champion"
Mo'Cheddah – 
Jesse Jagz – "Wetin Dey"
D'Prince – "Omoba"
Skuki – "Banger" (Winner)

Hip Hop World Revelation of the Year
Wande Coal (Winner)
Kel
Djinee
Illbliss
Omawumi

References

2010 music awards
2010 in Nigerian music
The Headies
Victoria Island, Lagos
21st century in Lagos
Entertainment events in Nigeria